Uaru fernandezyepezi is a species of cichlid native to South America where it is found in rivers of the Orinoco basin.  This species can reach a length of  TL.  It is also found in the aquarium trade.

The fish is named in honor of the late Venezuelan ichthyologist Agustín Fernández-Yépez (1916-1977), named at the request of Hans J. Köpke, a fish exporter and tour organizer in Venezuela, who collected the type specimen. Köpke considered Fernández-Yépez a friend and an “excellent connoisseur” of Venezuelan fishes.

See also
 Uaru
 Cichlid
 List of freshwater aquarium fish species

References
 Stawikowski, R. (1989)Ein neuer Cichlide aus dem oberen Orinoco-Einzug: Uaru fernandezyepezi n. sp. (Pisces: Perciformes: Cichlidae). Bonner Zoologische Beiträge v. 40 (no. 1): 19-26.
Kullander, S.O., 2003. Cichlidae (Cichlids). p. 605-654. In R.E. Reis, S.O. Kullander and C.J. Ferraris, Jr. (eds.) Checklist of the Freshwater Fishes of South and Central America. Porto Alegre: EDIPUCRS, Brasil. 

fernandezyepezi
Taxa named by Ranier Stawikowski
Fish described in 1989